Ustye is a rural locality (a village) in Kalininskoye Rural Settlement, Totemsky  District, Vologda Oblast, Russia. The population was 249 as of 2002.

Geography 
Ustye is located 37 km southwest of Totma (the district's administrative centre) by road. Lyubavchikha is the nearest rural locality.

References 

Rural localities in Totemsky District